"Allah Selamatkan Sultan Mahkota" is the state anthem of Kedah, Malaysia. The lyrics were written by Almarhum Abdullah Syed Hussain Shahabuddin and it was composed by J. A. Redhill (Reutenberg). It was officially adopted on 22 March 1937.

History
Reuternberg, a Russian Jew and the then-Conductor of the Selangor Club Orchestra, had been ordered to compose a state anthem for Kedah with $1000 as the reward. He successfully composed it in 25 minutes time. The plan to create it was initiated by the British Adviser of Kedah, S.L. Jones.

The anthem was recomposed by Tunku Yakob with the addition of its lyrics written by Hj. Mohammad Sheriff, the then Menteri Besar and the melody from J.F. Agustin in 1949.

Lyrics

References

Notes

External links
 National Anthems
 Instrumental Anthems

Kedah
Anthems of Malaysia
1937 songs

id:Kedah#Lagu negeri